Aleksandr Vikentyevich Shpakovsky (1899–1938) was a Soviet football player.

Honours
 USSR champion: 1924.

International career
Shpakovsky played his only game for USSR on November 16, 1924, in a friendly against Turkey, scoring in that game.

On March 14, 1938 Shpakovsky was arrested by the NKVD and accused of anti-Soviet activities. He was executed by firing squad on June 9, 1938. In 1958 he was rehabilitated and cleared of all charges.

External links
  Profile
 Profile at the ukr-football.org
 Biography at the Kopanyi-myach.info

1899 births
1938 deaths
Footballers from Kharkiv
People from Kharkov Governorate
FC Dynamo Kharkiv players
FC Dynamo Kharkiv managers
Ukrainian footballers
Soviet footballers
Great Purge victims from Ukraine
Association football forwards
Ukrainian football managers
Soviet Union international footballers